Edward Antoon Portielje (8 February 1861, Antwerp - 18 December 1949, Antwerp) was a Belgian genre painter.

Biography
He was born to the painter, Jan Portielje, and his wife Eulalie née Lemaire (1828-1903). His older brother, Gerard, was also a genre painter.

His first art lessons came from his father. From 1877 to 1881, he was a full-time student there, under the tutelage of Polydore Beaufaux, Charles Verlat and Nicaise de Keyser.

He was married twice, first to Jeanne Marie Cochet then, in 1888, to Rosa Hermans, with whom he had a son. During World War I he lived in Brussels; returning to Antwerp in 1919. 

Genre scenes were his speciality, with an occasional portrait or seascape. Much of his inspiration came from the fishing communities in Zeeland. Many of his works are series of similar interior scenes, created according to the wishes of his agents,  and Guillaume Campo (1880-1952). They generally consist of a room with a sunny window, occupied by women in traditional costume, engaged in some daily activity. These paintings were very popular; selling throughout Europe and the United States.

In 1894, he worked together with Edouard de Jans and Joseph Dierickx to create murals for the Exposition Internationale d'Anvers.

Sources 
 "Portieltje, Edward" in: Dictionnaire des Peintres Belges (Online)
 Patrick Berko, Viviane Berko; Dictionary of Belgian painters born between 1750 & 1875;  Brussels : Laconti, 1981 
 Paul Piron, De Belgische beeldende kunstenaars uit de 19de en 20ste eeuw, Art in Belgium, 1999

External links 

 More works by Portielje @ ArtNet

1861 births
1949 deaths
Belgian painters
Belgian genre painters
Royal Academy of Fine Arts (Antwerp) alumni
Artists from Antwerp